Ganjabad Rural District is a rural district (dehestan) in Esmaili District, Anbarabad County, Kerman Province, Iran. At the 2006 census, its population was 9,427, in 1,969 families. The rural district has 44 villages.

References 

Rural Districts of Kerman Province
Anbarabad County